Marc Laniel (born January 16, 1968 in Oshawa, Ontario) is a retired professional ice hockey defenceman. He was drafted in the third round, 62nd overall, by the New Jersey Devils in the 1986 NHL Entry Draft. He played the first ten years of his professional career, 1987 to 1997, playing for various teams in the American Hockey League, the International Hockey League and the East Coast Hockey League. He then spent four season playing in the German Deutsche Eishockey Liga before playing his final two seasons, 2001–02 and 2002–03, in the United Kingdom playing for the Sheffield Steelers.

Career statistics

References

1968 births
Birmingham Bulls (ECHL) players
Canadian ice hockey defencemen
Cincinnati Cyclones (IHL) players
Essen Mosquitoes players
Fort Wayne Komets players
Fredericton Canadiens players
Houston Aeros (1994–2013) players
Ice hockey people from Ontario
Las Vegas Thunder players
Living people
New Jersey Devils draft picks
Oshawa Generals players
Phoenix Roadrunners (IHL) players
San Diego Gulls (IHL) players
Schwenninger Wild Wings players
Sheffield Steelers players
Sportspeople from Oshawa
Utica Devils players
Winston-Salem Thunderbirds players
Canadian expatriate ice hockey players in England
Canadian expatriate ice hockey players in Germany